Celtic Celtic (That's the Team for Me) is a Celtic F.C. football song that was sung by Derek Warfield. This song is one of the singles on album Songs for the Bhoys.

References 

Celtic F.C. songs
2005 songs
Football songs and chants
Song articles with missing songwriters